"Ritual" is a 1970 Australian television plays. It was called "a tale of terror for two characters".

Cast
 John Norman
 Lyndall Rowe

Reception
The Canberra Times called it "disappointing".

References

1970 television plays
1970s Australian television plays
1970 Australian television episodes
Australian Plays (season 2) episodes